Les Apparitions fugitives, sold in the United States as The Fugitive Apparitions and in Britain as Short Lived Apparitions, is a 1904 French short silent film by Georges Méliès. It was sold by Méliès's Star Film Company and is numbered 550–551 in its catalogues.

Méliès plays the magician in the film, which uses substitution splices, dissolves, and multiple exposures to create its special effects. A paper print of the film survives at the Library of Congress.

References

External links
 

French black-and-white films
Films directed by Georges Méliès
French silent short films